Niethammeriodes diremptella is a species of snout moth described by Émile Louis Ragonot in 1887. It is found in Spain.

The wingspan is about 24 mm.

References

Moths described in 1887
Phycitini